is a retired Japanese sprinter who specializes in the 400 metres.

His personal best time is 45.77 seconds, achieved in September 2006 in Yokohama.

Achievements

References

External links

Yoshihiro Horigome at JAAF 
Yoshihiro Horigome at Fujitsu Track & Field Team  (archived)

1981 births
Living people
Sportspeople from Miyagi Prefecture
Nippon Sport Science University alumni
Japanese male sprinters
Athletes (track and field) at the 2008 Summer Olympics
Olympic athletes of Japan
World Athletics Championships athletes for Japan
Athletes (track and field) at the 2006 Asian Games
Universiade medalists in athletics (track and field)
Universiade silver medalists for Japan
Asian Games competitors for Japan
Competitors at the 2003 Summer Universiade
Medalists at the 2005 Summer Universiade
20th-century Japanese people
21st-century Japanese people